Ladahachandra was the fourth ruler of the Chandra dynasty in eastern Bengal. Although he was a Buddhist and a renowned patron of Buddhism, he was also very sympathetic to Vaishnavite teachings (according to the two copperplates discovered at Mainamati).

References 

Chandra kings